1-Amino-1,3-dicarboxycyclopentane (ACPD) is a chemical compound that binds to the metabotropic glutamate receptor (mGluR), acting as a mGluR agonist. ACPD is a rigid analogue of the neurotransmitter glutamate and does not activate ionotropic glutamate receptors. However, it has been reported to be an agonist of the glycine site of the NMDA receptor. ACPD can induce convulsions in neonatal rats.

References

Amino acids
Dicarboxylic acids
MGlu1 receptor agonists
MGlu5 receptor agonists
NMDA receptor agonists
Cyclopentanes